Talageh or Talagah may refer to:
 Talageh-ye Olya (disambiguation)
 Talageh-ye Sofla (disambiguation)